The 2018 Poker Masters was the second season of the Poker Masters. It took place from September 8-15, 2018, from the PokerGO Studio at ARIA Resort & Casino in Las Vegas, Nevada. The event was sponsored by Poker Central, and every final table was streamed on PokerGO. There were seven events on the schedule including five No-Limit Hold'em tournaments, along with a Pot-Limit Omaha and Short Deck event. Buy-ins ranged from $10,000 to the $100,000 Main Event.

The Main Event was won by America's David Peters, and the Poker Masters Purple Jacket was awarded to Bosnia and Herzegovina's Ali Imsirovic.

Schedule 
The schedule for the 2018 Poker Masters included five No-Limit Hold'em tournaments, and both a Pot-Limit Omaha and Short Deck event. The first six events lasted two days with the first day ending once the final table was down to six players. Those players returned the next day to resume play with the action streamed on PokerGO. The Main Event was a $100,000 buy-in and played out over three days with the final two days streamed on PokerGO.

Purple Jacket standings 
The 2018 Poker Masters awarded the Purple Jacket to the player that accumulated the most points during the series unlike in 2017 when the winner was determined by the most winnings. Bosnia and Herzegovina's Ali Imsirovic won two events, and cashed three times on his way to accumulating $1,288,600 in winnings. Imsirovic accumulated 660 points and was awarded the Purple Jacket.

Results

Event #1: $10,000 No-Limit Hold'em 

 2-Day Event: September 7-8, 2018
 Number of Entrants: 69
 Total Prize Pool: $690,000
 Number of Payouts: 10
 Winning Hand:

Event #2: $25,000 No-Limit Hold'em 

 2-Day Event: September 8-9, 2018
 Number of Entrants: 50
 Total Prize Pool: $1,250,000
 Number of Payouts: 8
 Winning Hand:

Event #3: $25,000 Pot-Limit Omaha 

 2-Day Event: September 9-10, 2018
 Number of Entrants: 37
 Total Prize Pool: $925,000
 Number of Payouts: 6
 Winning Hand:

Event #4: $10,000 Short Deck 

 2-Day Event: September 10-11, 2018
 Number of Entrants: 55
 Total Prize Pool: $550,000
 Number of Payouts: 8
 Winning Hand:

Event #5: $25,000 No-Limit Hold'em 

 2-Day Event: September 11-12, 2018
 Number of Entrants: 66
 Total Prize Pool: $1,650,000
 Number of Payouts: 10
 Winning Hand:

Event #6: $50,000 No-Limit Hold'em 

 2-Day Event: September 12-13, 2018
 Number of Entrants: 47
 Total Prize Pool: $2,350,000
 Number of Payouts: 7
 Winning Hand:

Event #7: $100,000 No-Limit Hold'em Main Event 

 3-Day Event: September 13-15, 2018
 Number of Entrants: 25
 Total Prize Pool: $2,500,000
 Number of Payouts: 4
 Winning Hand:

References

External links 

 Results

2018 in poker
2018 in sports in Nevada
Poker tournaments
Television shows about poker